Svetlana Buravova-Khapsalis (Светлана Буравова-Хапсалис, born 15 June 1973) was a Russian born Kazakhstani female water polo player. She was a member of the Kazakhstan women's national water polo team, playing as a goalkeeper.

She competed for the team at the 2000 Summer Olympics; she was also part of the team at the 2004 Summer Olympics, but did not play. On club level she played for Eurasia Rakhat in Kazakhstan.

See also
 List of women's Olympic water polo tournament goalkeepers

References

External links
Svetlana Buravova at Sports Reference
https://www.newspapers.com/newspage/120654256/
http://www.h2opolo.be/geschiedenis/WP_2000_OS.html

1973 births
Living people
Place of birth missing (living people)
Kazakhstani female water polo players
Water polo goalkeepers
Olympic water polo players of Kazakhstan
Water polo players at the 2000 Summer Olympics
Water polo players at the 2004 Summer Olympics